(for the airport in Valley County, Idaho, see Big Creek Airport (Idaho))

Big Creek is an unincorporated community in Shoshone County, Idaho, United States, outside Kellogg and South of the Shoshone Country Club, where National Forest Develop Road 264 becomes Big Creek Road.

History
Big Creek is home to two large mines: the Crescent and Sunshine mines. The Sunshine mine is one of the largest producers of silver; in its history it produced more silver than the famous Comstock Lode in Nevada.

The community is associated to the ZIP code of Kellogg (83837).

Big Creek's population was 31 in 1960.

Climate
This climatic region is typified by large seasonal temperature differences, with warm to hot (and often humid) summers and cold (sometimes severely cold) winters.  According to the Köppen Climate Classification system, Big Creek has a humid continental climate, abbreviated "Dfb" on climate maps.

References 

Unincorporated communities in Shoshone County, Idaho
Unincorporated communities in Idaho